Brian Berdan is a film editor. He was born in Michigan and earned his glider pilot's licence on December 12, 1992.  Graduating from UC Berkeley in 1984, Berdan started his career with a job sweeping floors at Studio C, in San Francisco, then moved on to Lucasfilm in the post production division.  From there, he began his freelance editing career as an apprentice editor on David Lynch's Blue Velvet.  He also trained on Peter Bogdanovich's Noises Off and Oliver Stone's Heaven & Earth.  It was Stone who gave Berdan his first credit as Editor on the manic and controversial Natural Born Killers.  He continued working with Stone on Nixon and U Turn. He lives in the Pacific Northwest.

Filmography

Blue Velvet (1986)
Three for the Road (1987)
Cherry 2000 (1987)
Rented Lips (1988)
Madhouse (1990)
Wild at Heart (1990)
Noises Off (1992)
Night and the City (1992)
Heaven & Earth (1993)
Natural Born Killers (1994)
Amanda and the Alien (1995)
Nixon (1995)
The Basketball Diaries (1995)
The Net (1995)
Grosse Pointe Blank (1997)
U Turn (1997)
The Sadness of Sex (1998)
Smoke Signals (1998)
The Book of Stars (1999)
The Thirteenth Year (1999) (TV)
Auggie Rose (2000)
Finder's Fee (2001)
The Mothman Prophecies (2002)
Farewell to Harry (2002)
The Big Bounce (2004)
The Cave (2005)
Domino (2005)
Crank (2006)
Outsourced (2006)
Cleaner (2007)
12 Rounds (2009)
Love (2011)
5 Days of War (2011)
Ghost Rider: Spirit of Vengeance (2011)
The Signal (2014)
Rosemary's Baby (2014) (TV)
The Royals (2015) (TV)
The Boy (2016)
Song to Song (2017)
Twin Peaks (2017) (TV)
Crypto (2019)
Underwater (2020)
Brahms: The Boy II (2020)
Separation (2021)

External links

American film editors
American Cinema Editors
Living people
University of California, Berkeley alumni
Year of birth missing (living people)